Bill Fraser (1908–1987) was a Scottish actor.

Bill Fraser may also refer to:
Bill Fraser (New Zealand politician) (1924–2001), New Zealand politician 
Bill Fraser (ice hockey) (1916–1997), Canadian ice hockey goaltender
Bill Fraser (Canadian politician), politician in the province of New Brunswick, Canada
Bill Fraser (Australian footballer) (1867–1938), Australian rules footballer
Bill Fraser (English footballer) (1907–?), English footballer with Northampton Town and Southampton
Billy Fraser (born 1945), Scottish footballer with Huddersfield Town and Heart of Midlothian
Billy Fraser (footballer, born 1868) (1868–?), Scottish footballer with Renton and Stoke City

See also
William Fraser (disambiguation)